Lancaster University Management School (LUMS) is the business school of Lancaster University in Lancaster, England. The school was established in 1964. A full range of subjects are taught, ranging from undergraduate degrees to postgraduate degrees, including executive and full-time MBAs, PhDs and post-experience executive education. The Financial Times consistently ranks Lancaster University's MBA programme amongst the top in the world.

Reputation and accreditation

In 2022, Lancaster University was ranked in the top 15 UK universities in several major national league tables (outlined in table below). LUMS is one of a small group of business schools in the world to have achieved quadruple accreditation by the leading international business school accreditation organisations:

 AACSB (USA)
 EQUIS (Europe)
 Association of MBAs (UK)
 Small Business Charter (UK)
The School was awarded an Athena Swan Bronze award in 2021, in recognition of its commitment to advancing gender equality.

Lancaster University Rankings

Lancaster University Management School Rankings

Campus and facilities

LUMS is one of the four faculties of Lancaster University and is situated on the university campus, south of the city of Lancaster. The campus consists of a number of new buildings and facilities grouped together near the south end of the campus.

Within the Management School, the Hub area and atrium of the school opened in 2005. The Charles Carter Building opened in 2010 and provides additional teaching and study facilities. The West Pavilion building opened in 2021, providing new lecture theatres, study and teaching space. From 2022, it is home to the Departments of Entrepreneurship and Strategy, Marketing, and Organisation, Work and Technology.

Organisational relationships
LUMS has worked in partnership with many companies to develop customised executive education. Partners have included: AstraZeneca, BAE Systems, Bass, British Airways, Pilkington, Rexam, Royal & Sun Alliance and Total. The School has worked with many public sector organisations including the NHS and The UK Cabinet Office. Through its Department of Entrepreneurship and Strategy, it also provides business support and knowledge transfer for small and medium enterprises in England's North West region. LUMS was awarded a Small Business Charter Gold Award in 2014.

In 2005, LUMS partnered with Ernst & Young to offer undergraduate degrees in Accounting and Finance, in which students undertake two periods of paid work-experience with Ernst & Young, in preparation for a Chartered Accountant career. Several LUMS postgraduate programmes have modules designed and delivered by employers – these include Accenture, Deloitte, Cisco, IBM and SAP AG.

Academic profile

Seven subject areas exist within the Management School: Accounting and Finance, Economics, Entrepreneurship and Strategy, Management Science, Marketing, Organisation, Work and Technology, and Business and Management.

Research focus
In the 2021 Research Excellence Framework (REF), Lancaster University Management School submitted to Unit of Assessment (UoA) 17: Business and Management Studies. LUMS was ranked 1st in the UK for 'research power' - a recognition of breadth and depth of research expertise; equal-first for research environment (both of these rankings were retained from the previous REF in 2014); and 21st for grade point average (GPA).

The School's research focuses around three main pillars: Sustainability; Social Justice; and Innovation in Place. Ten research centres allow researchers from different departments to work together on projects.

Research Centres at LUMS
Centre for Consumption Insights
Centre for Family Business
Centre for Financial Econometrics, Asset Markets and Macroeconomic Policy
Centre for Health Futures
Centre for Marketing Analytics and Forecasting
Pentland Centre for Sustainability in Business
Centre for Practice Theory (in conjunction with the Faculty of Arts and Social Sciences at Lancaster University)
Centre for Productivity and Efficiency
Centre for Technological Futures
Centre for Transport and Logistics

Postgraduate study

LUMS delivers a range of taught and research courses, catering for continuing students and professional and executive training. Postgraduate students who study at LUMS are automatically made members of Graduate College.

Undergraduate study
LUMS currently has 2,268 undergraduate students enrolled, all of which will have been assigned to a college of Lancaster University in their first year. Most programmes offer the capability to take part in an industrial placement year. It is argued that such placement- or internship-focused degrees enhance students' employability upon completion of degree programmes.

Extra-curricular
A range of extra-curricular opportunities exist at LUMS, in addition to those available within Lancaster University. Each year, the School submits a number of teams into the UK IBM Business Challenge and is involved in numerous case competitions.

Study abroad and international exchanges
Lancaster University has an international exchange programme of which LUMS is an active member. Study Abroad Programmes enable students from one host university or institution to "swap" places with another from an alternative institution so that both may enjoy a new culture, setting and different approach to learning. Many of the undergraduate programmes at LUMS include the option to study abroad for periods ranging from one term to one year.

Notable alumni

References

External links
Lancaster University Management School website

Educational institutions established in 1964
Business schools in England
Lancaster University
Departments of Lancaster University
1964 establishments in England